Truncatella laurocerasi is a pathogen the primarily infects strawberries.

References

External links 
 Index Fungorum
 USDA ARS Fungal Database

Fungi described in 1949
Fungal strawberry diseases
Xylariales